Lo-Ellen Park Secondary School is a high school located on Loach's Road in the South End of Greater Sudbury, Ontario. It is administered by the Rainbow District School Board, and the current principal is Pamela Potvin and the current vice principals of the school are Stephen Mackenzie and Melanie Bertrand.

Academics

The school offers the International Baccalaureate (IB) program as its main magnet program, but also offers the Laptop program and French immersion.  IB prep courses are offered as laptop or regular courses, and many are also offered in immersion.

Lo-Ellen also offers two special education programs- ASD and life skills.

Lo-Ellen is known in the Sudbury region for the quality of its academics.  This is further supported by its green rank in the Fraser Institute's report cards.

Lo-Ellen offers Specialist High Skills Majors (SHSM) in Environmental, Architectural Design, Construction and Manufacturing.

Clubs and associations
Adopt-A-Family, Amnesty International, Art Club, Athletic Association, Beekeepers Club, Big Brothers & Big Sisters Club, Biology Contests, Breakfast Club, Christian Youth Group, Concert and Jazz Bands, Create Writing Publication, E-Paper, Environmental Club, Film Production Club, French Connection Club, Gay Straight Alliance Club, Graduation/Prom Committee, Improve Team, International Travel Club, Knitting Club, Leo Club, Math Contests, Model United Nations, Movie Club, Multicultural Club, Musical Theater Executive, National Novel Writing Month, Peer Tutors, Photography, Reach for the Top, Relay for Life, Robotics Team, Rock Band, Student Council, Student for Change, Writing Contests, Smash Club and Yearbook.

Athletics
Lo-Ellen is the home of many talented athletes, provincial-level sports teams, coached by an array of skilled coaches. The following sports are offered:
Badminton, Basketball, Cross Country Running, Curling, Flag Football (female only), Football (male only), Golf, Gymnastics, Hockey, Skiing (both Nordic and alpine), Soccer, Swimming, Tennis, Track & Field, Volleyball, and Wrestling.

The Women's Basketball team competes at the prep level in the OSBA (Ontario Scholastic Basketball Association).

See also
List of high schools in Ontario

References

External links
 Lo-Ellen Park Secondary School
 Rainbow School Board

High schools in Greater Sudbury
International Baccalaureate schools in Ontario
Educational institutions in Canada with year of establishment missing